In baseball, the German championship of the men is determined in the Baseball Bundesliga.

In softball, the German championship of the women is determined in the Softball Bundesliga.

A championship of the gentlemen in softball, or the ladies in baseball, does not exist at present.

German Men's Champions

1951-1970

1951: BC Stuttgart
 1952: Frankfurt Juniors
 1953: Frankfurt Juniors
 1954: Mannheim Knights
 1955: Frankfurt Juniors
 1956: Mannheim Knights
 1957: MEV München
 1958: Mannheim Knights
 1959: Mannheim Knights
 1960: TB Germania Mannheim
 1961: TB Germania Mannheim
 1962: Bayern München
 1963: TB Germania Mannheim
 1964: TB Germania Mannheim
 1965: VFR Mannheim
 1966: VFR Mannheim
 1967: Colt 45 Darmstadt
 1968: Colt 45 Darmstadt
 1969: Bayern München
 1970: VFR Mannheim

1982-present

1982: Mannheim Tornados
 1983: Mannheim Amigos
 1984: Mannheim Tornados
 1985: Mannheim Tornados
 1986: Mannheim Tornados
 1987: Mannheim Tornados
 1988: Mannheim Tornados
 1989: Mannheim Tornados
 1990: Köln Cardinals
 1991: Mannheim Tornados
 1992: Mannheim Amigos
 1993: Mannheim Tornados
 1994: Mannheim Tornados
 1995: Trier Cardinals
 1996: Trier Cardinals
 1997: Mannheim Tornados
 1998: Köln Dodgers
1999: Paderborn Untouchables
2000: Lokstedt Stealers
 2001: Paderborn Untouchables
 2002: Paderborn Untouchables
 2003: Paderborn Untouchables
 2004: Paderborn Untouchables
 2005: Paderborn Untouchables
 2006: Solingen Alligators
2007: Mainz Athletics
2008: Regensburg Legionäre
2009: Heidenheim Heideköpfe
2010: Regensburg Legionäre
2011: Regensburg Legionäre
2012: Regensburg Legionäre
2013: Regensburg Legionäre
2014: Solingen Alligators
2015: Heidenheim Heideköpfe
2016: Mainz Athletics
2017: Heidenheim Heideköpfe
2018: Bonn Capitals
2019: Heidenheim Heideköpfe
2020: Heidenheim Heideköpfe
2021: Heidenheim Heideköpfe
2022: Bonn Capitals

German Women's Champions (Softball)

 (1981: Munich Tigers)
 1982: Munich Tigers
 1983: Munich Tigers
 1984: Bielefeld Peanuts
 1985: Bielefeld Peanuts
 1986: Bielefeld Peanuts
 1987: Bielefeld Peanuts
 1988: Bielefeld Peanuts
 1989: Bielefeld Peanuts
 1990: Bielefeld Peanuts
 1991: Bielefeld Peanuts
 1992: Bielefeld Peanuts
 1993: Bielefeld Peanuts
 1994: Bielefeld Peanuts
 1995: Hamburg Knights
 1996: Mannheim Tornados
 1997: Mannheim Tornados
 1998: Mannheim Tornados
 1999: Mannheim Tornados
 2000: Mannheim Tornados
 2001: Brauweiler Raging Abbots
 2002: Brauweiler Raging Abbots
 2003: Mannheim Tornados
 2004: Freising Grizzlies
 2005: Hamburg Knights
 2006: Mannheim Tornados
 2007: Mannheim Tornados
 2008: Hamburg Knights
 2009: Mannheim Tornados
 2010: Wesseling Vermins
 2011: Mannheim Tornados
 2012: Wesseling Vermins
 2013: Wesseling Vermins
 2014: Wesseling Vermins
 2015: Wesseling Vermins
 2016: Mannheim Tornados
 2017: Mannheim Tornados
 2018: Wesseling Vermins
 2019: Wesseling Vermins

Junior German Champions

 1985: Mannheim Tornados
 1986: Mannheim Tornados
 1987: Zülpich Eagles
 1988: Zülpich Eagles
 1989: Zülpich Eagles
 1990: St. Pauli Knights
 1991: Düsseldorf Senators
 1992: Düsseldorf Senators
 1993: Düsseldorf Senators
 1994: Holzwickede Joboxers
 1995: Bonn Capitals
 1996: Mainz Athletics
 1997: Mainz Athletics
 1998: Mannheim Tornados
 1999: Bonn Capitals
 2000: Mainz Athletics
 2001: Mainz Athletics
 2002: Mainz Athletics
 2003: Paderborn Untouchables
 2004: Heidenheim Heideköpfe
 2005: Paderborn Untouchables
 2006: Paderborn Untouchables
 2007: Paderborn Untouchables
 2008: Bonn Capitals
 2009: Mainz Athletics
 2010: Dohren Wild Farmers
 2011: Mannheim Tornados
 2012: Mannheim Tornados
 2013: Regensburg Legionäre
 2014: Regensburg Legionäre
 2015: Regensburg Legionäre
 2016: Regensburg Legionäre
 2017: Untouchables Paderborn
 2018: Untouchables Paderborn
 2019: Regensburg Legionäre

Junior Girl's German Champions (Softball)

 2006: Wesseling Vermins
 2007: Wesseling Vermins
 2008: Neunkirchen Nightmares
 2009: Karlsruhe Cougars
 2010: Wesseling Vermins
 2011: Wesseling Vermins
 2012: Wesseling Vermins
 2013: Mannheim Tornados
 2014: Freising Grizzlies
 2015: Freising Grizzlies
 2016: Wesseling Vermins
 2017: Freising Grizzlies
 2018: Wesseling Vermins
 2019: Karlsruhe Cougars

Youth German Champions

 1973: Bad Kreuznach Tigers
 1974: VFR Mannheim ( Cubs )
 1975 - 1976 No Champion
 1977: Mannheim Tornados
 1978: Mannheim Tornados
 1979: Mannheim Tornados
 1980: Mannheim Tornados
 1981: Mannheim Tornados
 1982: Zülpich Eagles
 1983: Mannheim Amigos
 1984: Mannheim Tornados
 1985: Mannheim Tornados
 1986: Mannheim Tornados
 1987: Zülpich Eagles
 1988 - 1989 unknown
 1990: Brauweiler Raging Abbots
 1991: Mannheim Amigos
 1992: Mannheim Amigos
 1993: Mannheim Amigos
 1994: Kassel Herkules
 1995: Darmstadt Whippets
 1996: Mainz Athletics
 1997: Bonn Capitals
 1998: Gauting Indians
 1999: Herrenberg Wanderers
 2000: Ladenburg Romans
 2001: Mannheim Amigos
 2002: Paderborn Untouchables
 2003: Mainz Athletics
 2004: Paderborn Untouchables
 2005: Bonn Capitals
 2006: Bonn Capitals
 2007: Erbach Grasshoppers
 2008: Mannheim Tornados
 2009: Mainz Athletics
 2010: Bonn Capitals
 2011: HSV Stealers
 2012: Stuttgart Reds
 2013: Paderborn Untouchables
 2014: Solingen Alligators
 2015: Bad Homburg Hornets
 2016: Mainz Athletics
 2017: Regensburg Legionäre
 2018: Stuttgart Reds
 2019: Bonn Capitals

Youth Girl's German Champions (Softball)

 2018: Freising Grizzlies
 2019: Karlsruhe Cougars / Stuttgart Reds

Students Champions

 1973: VFR Mannheim ( Pumas )
 1974: Bad Kreuznach Tigers
 1975: No Champion
 1976: No Champion
 1977: Mannheim Tornados
 1978: Mannheim Tornados
 1979: Mannheim Tornados
 1980: Mannheim Tornados
 1981: unknown
 1982: Mannheim Tornados
 1983: Darmstadt-Messel Devils
 1984: Zülpich Eagles
 1985: Zülpich Eagles
 1986: unknown
 1987: unknown
 1988: unknown
 1989: Brauweiler Raging Abbots
 1990: Mannheim Amigos
 1991: unknown
 1992: unknown
 1993: Mainz Athletics
 1994: Mainz Athletics
 1995: Mainz Athletics
 1996: Mainz Athletics
 1997: Taunus Eagles
 1998: Schwetzingen Braves
 1999: Mainz Athletics
 2000: Neu-Anspach Eagles
 2001: Lüneburg Woodlarks
 2002: Mainz Athletics
 2003: Bonn Capitals
 2004: Solingen Alligators
 2005: Bonn Capitals
 2006: Mannheim Tornados
 2007: Mannheim Tornados
 2008: Heidelberg Hedgehogs
 2009: Paderborn Untouchables
 2010: Stuttgart Reds
 2011: Solingen Alligators
 2012: Dreieich Vultures
 2013: Regensburg Legionäre
 2014: Regensburg Legionäre
 2015: Regensburg Legionäre
 2016: Stuttgart Reds 
 2017: Stuttgart Reds
 2018: Stuttgart Reds
 2019: Bonn Capitals

Men's Cup Winners (DBV-Pokal)

 1993: Mainz Athletics
 1994: Mannheim Tornados
 1995: Mannheim Tornados
 1996: Bonn Capitals
 1997: Regensburg Legionäre
 1998: Paderborn Untouchables
 1999: Paderborn Untouchables
 2000: Lokstedt Stealers
 2001: Köln Dodgers
 2002: Regensburg Legionäre
 2003: Regensburg Legionäre
 2004: Regensburg Legionäre
 2005: Regensburg Legionäre
 2006: Regensburg Legionäre

Women's Cup Winners (DBV-Pokal)

 1996: Mannheim Tornados
 1997: Mannheim Tornados
 1998: Mannheim Tornados
 1999: Mannheim Tornados
 2000: Mannheim Tornados
 2001: Mannheim Tornados
 2002: Brauweiler Raging Abbots
 2003: Brauweiler Raging Abbots
 2004: Hamburg Knights
 2005: Mannheim Tornados
 2006: Hamburg Knights

Women's Cup Winners (Deutschlandpokal)

 2012: Neunkirchen Nightmares
 2013: Neunkirchen Nightmares
 2014: Neunkirchen Nightmares
 2015: Mannheim Tornados
 2016: Wesseling Vermins
 2017: Wesseling Vermins
 2018: Neunkirchen Nightmares
 2019: Hamburg Knights

See also

References

Baseball competitions in Germany
Baseball trophies and awards
Baseball
Softball competitions